The 1937 Workers' Winter Olympiad was the fifth edition of International Workers' Olympiads. The games were held from February 18 to February 21 at the Czechoslovakian town of Janské Lázně.

Sports 
Alpine skiing
Nordic skiing
Figure skating

Participating countries

Nordic skiing

Men's 15 km cross-country skiing

Men's 30 km cross-country skiing

Men's patrol race

Women's 6 km cross-country skiing

Women's patrol race

Men's ski jumping

Men's Nordic combined

Alpine skiing

Men's downhill

Men's slalom

Women's downhill

Women's slalom

Speed skating 
The races were cancelled due to mild weather in Trautenau (Trutnov), where the races should have been held.

Figure skating 
??

References 

International Workers' Olympiads
1937 in multi-sport events
International sports competitions hosted by Czechoslovakia
Multi-sport events in Czechoslovakia
February 1937 sports events
Winter sports competitions in Czechoslovakia